John Anstis  (17 November 1708 – 5 December 1754) was an officer of arms at the College of Arms in London.

Biography
Anstis was born in St Clement Danes, Westminster, and was the seventh child and eldest son of John Anstis and his wife, Elizabeth. He was educated at Westminster School and privately by Michael Maittaire. He graduated from Corpus Christi College, Oxford, in 1725. In May of that year he was made genealogist of the newly created Order of the Bath. On 6 October 1727, he was appointed Blanc Coursier Herald. This was a new office attached to that of the genealogist and first companion of the order; this creation was the work of his father, who had risen to the post of Garter Principal King of Arms. Later in 1727, Anstis was created joint Garter with his father and in 1733 he accompanied him to The Hague to invest the Prince of Orange with the Order of the Garter. In 1736 he was made a fellow of the Society of Antiquaries of London and he became the sole Garter King of Arms on his father's death in 1744. In 1749, he became a barrister of the Middle Temple, although he never practised law. The younger Anstis died a bachelor on 5 December 1754 at his house in Mortlake, Surrey, and was buried at Duloe, Cornwall.

Arms

See also 
 Heraldry

External links 
 The College of Arms
 Heraldic List of Officers of Arms

References 
Citations

Bibliography
 John Anstis. The Register of the Most Noble Order of the Garter. (London, 1724).
 Edward Cruickshanks. Anstis, John. Parliament Records (London, 1715–54).
 Walter H Godfrey and Sir Anthony Wagner, The College of Arms, Queen Victoria Street: being the sixteenth and final monograph of the London Survey Committee. (London, 1963).
 Mark Noble, A History of the College of Arms. (London, 1805).
 Anthony Wagner and Albert Rowse. John Anstis: Garter King of Arms (London, 1992).
 Nicolas, Nicholas H. History of the Orders of Knighthood of the British Empire, Vol III. (London, 1842).
 Gandell, H.L. (January 1970). "Blanc Coursier's Tabard". The Coat of Arms XI (81): 11.
 Sir Anthony Wagner. A Catalogue of English Mediaeval Rolls of Arms. Harleian Society (London, 1950).
 Sir Anthony Wagner. Heralds of England: a History of the Office and College of Arms. (London, 1967).

1708 births
1754 deaths
Antiquarians from London
English genealogists
Alumni of Corpus Christi College, Oxford
Members of the Middle Temple
English officers of arms
Fellows of the Society of Antiquaries of London
Garter Principal Kings of Arms
People educated at Westminster School, London